Mark Casson  (born 1945) is a British economist and academic. He is a professor of economics at the University of Reading in England. He was Head of Department (1987–94) and is the institution's current Director of the Centre for Institutional Performance.

Together with Peter Buckley, he developed the internalisation theory of the multinational enterprise which is widely used to analyse the internationalisation of firms. He also developed the modern economic theory of entrepreneurship through a synthesis of the ideas of Joseph Schumpeter, Friedrich Hayek and Frank Knight. According to this theory, successful entrepreneurs demonstrate good judgement in making risky innovations, and are rewarded through either profits or salaries depending on whether they act as owners or managers of their firms.

His research led him to conclude that culture and institutions influence the performance of both individual entrepreneurs and large multinational corporations. He developed a leader-follower theory of culture in which leaders set cultural norms which condition the way in which entrepreneurs and managers take decisions. Historical research is the natural way to test such a theory, and his recent work has therefore focused on the application of institutional theory to business history and economic history. This led him to undertake a major study of Victorian British entrepreneurship - the building of the railway  system through private enterprise - which is the subject of one of his most recent books.

Mark Casson is one of the founding members of the Reading School of International Business, a worldwide network of economists established in the 1970s at the University of Reading, England, which has been influential in changing public perceptions of the costs and benefits of multinational enterprises and foreign direct investment.  He is also the general editor of two book series, The Globalisation of the World Economy, and the Handbooks of Research Methods and Applications in the Social Sciences.

Internalisation theory

Internalisation theory explains very complex phenomena in terms of very simple principles. Buckley and Casson use the theory to explain the emergence of multinational enterprise. According to Adam Smith’s concept of the division of labour, market economies encourage individuals to specialise in producing a particular good or service which is sold for profit, and to use their income to purchase goods produced by other people. There are limits to specialisation, however. Because of market imperfections, there are certain goods and services that are difficult to sell. In particular, an individual who acquires some knowledge that affords a profit opportunity will find it difficult to sell that knowledge to anyone else. Other people will not believe that the knowledge is valuable unless they know what it is, and if they know what it is they have no need to buy it. Firms that undertake R&D are in this position. They find it difficult to license new technologies they have developed and therefore have to exploit their knowledge themselves. To serve the global market they need to establish an international network of production plants and/or sales outlets. Because they operate facilities in more than country, they become a multinational enterprise. The foreign facilities are linked by common dependence on the R&D facility. If different plants specialise in different parts of the production process then the plants will also be linked by international intermediate product flows. These intermediate product flows will also be internal to the firm. Internalisation theory can be extended to analyse other ways of exploiting knowledge, including  licensing, subcontracting (outsourcing), and strategic alliances (joint ventures).

Economic theory of entrepreneurship

Before 1980, policy-makers paid little attention to entrepreneurship, but recently there has been an explosion of interest in the subject. Much of this focuses on small firms and their potential for regional regeneration. Owning and managing a small firm was not, however, the original meaning of the term ‘entrepreneur’. According to Casson, entrepreneurship signifies the promotion of innovative high-risk projects that contribute to economic efficiency and growth. Risky innovations can easily fail, however. Casson argues that entrepreneurs must trade off the expected benefits of success against the expected costs of failure. If there were simple rules for making these calculations, then politicians or planners could take innovation decisions. But such decisions are more akin to medical diagnosis than to pure calculation. Information is incomplete and decisions must be based on symptoms rather than facts. Successful decisions depend on good judgement, in other words. Different people observe different symptoms and may even interpret the same symptom differently, so consensus is impossible.  Under these conditions private entrepreneurs, who are confident in  their own judgement and optimistic of success, step forward and commit their own funds (or those of family, friends and shareholders) to a project. If their judgment is sound they make a profit and if it is not they lose. In effect they bet against the sceptics who do not invest.  Because the sceptics stay out, successful entrepreneurs may well achieve a monopoly position until opinions change and imitators appear. Casson develops this simple approach in a number of directions. He presents his theory as an original synthesis of other approaches, including Richard Cantillon’s theory of risk-bearing, Frank Knight’s theory of uncertainty-bearing, Joseph Schumpeter’s theory of innovation, Friedrich Hayek’s theory of distributed knowledge, Israel Kirzner’s theory of opportunity-seeking and William Baumol’s theory of incentives. He has developed formal models of entrepreneurship that demonstrate its contribution to economic performance and allow that contribution to be measured.

Economics of culture

Casson’s work on culture is based on a leader-follower model in which leaders supply their followers with fundamental values and beliefs which followers can use in their everyday decisions. These values and beliefs are shared amongst the members of the group that follows a particular leader. In economic terminology, the values and beliefs represent intangible public goods supplied by the leaders to their respective followers. In a free society different leaders espouse different values and compete for followers’ allegiance. In a civilized society competition will be based on discussion and debate in which leaders criticise each other views as well as promoting their own. Competition between leaders empowers followers to choose the leaders they prefer. Leadership is a costly activity, and leader can be rewarded in a variety of ways; many form non-profit organizations which attract donations or membership subscriptions. Casson's theory of leadership has an analogy with his theory of entrepreneurship because entrepreneurs establish for-profit organisations (firms) to exploit special knowledge they have developed, which is a technological and factual analogue of the systems of values and beliefs developed and exploited by leaders.

Casson's work has proved controversial on several counts. In an individualistic society everyone wants to be a leader and no one wants to be a follower, whereas in Casson's theory there cannot be a leader without followers. In popular culture leaders are often negatively stereotyped as autocratic ‘fuhrer’ figures, while in Casson's theory certain types of leader are benign. Some values, such as compassion, are superior to others, such as aggression, because they promote quality of life, and a leader who espouses such values confers benefits, not only on their own followers, but on society as a whole. Casson also argues that some values and beliefs are more efficient than others: in particular cultures that encourage trust and legitimate innovation tend to raise the economic performance of a group. Casson's theory has political and ideological implications . For example, market competition, in Casson's theory, is not an outlet for aggression, but a method of resolving differences of opinion in a peaceful way.

Business and economic history

The Victorian British economy has long been recognised as an important testing ground for theories of entrepreneurship and culture. There is a long-standing debate over the reasons for Britain's success in the Industrial Revolution 1760-1850, and its subsequent deindustrialization, 1870—1914. Casson's recent research on the Victorian railway system suggests that rise and decline were ‘two sides of the coin’. When individual enterprise, supported by family and community ties, was advantageous, Britain succeeded, and when it became a handicap Britain failed. Casson creates a counterfactual model of the British railway system based on what might have happened had Parliament accepted advice from the civil service at the time of the Railway Mania in 1844-5. Comparing the actual railway network with the counterfactual one suggests that about 30 per cent of railway mileage constructed was unnecessary and wasteful. Parliament rejected informed advice because it was distrustful of civil servants but well-disposed to private entrepreneurs, and because local interests were more important in Parliament than national ones. Social attitudes and political structures that had favoured early industrialisation therefore impeded the later development of the railways. The legacy of high transport costs caused by the over-building of railways reduced the competitiveness of British manufacturing exports and contributed to industrial decline.

Honours
In July 2017, Casson was elected a Fellow of the British Academy (FBA), the United Kingdom's national academy for the humanities and social sciences.

Published books
Casson, Mark C. and Catherine Casson (2013) The Entrepreneur in History, Basingstoke, Hants: Palgrave Macmillan, vii + 139pp.
Casson, Mark C. (2010) Entrepreneurship: Theory, Networks, History, Cheltenham: Edward Elgar, viii + 400pp.
Casson, Mark C. (2009) The World's First Railway System, Oxford: Oxford University Press, x + 540 pp. Reviewed by Grahame Boyes in J. Rly Canal Hist. Soc, 2010, 36, 131.
Buckley, Peter J. and Mark C. Casson (2009) The Multinational Enterprise Revisited: The Essential Buckley and Casson (with Peter J. Buckley), Basingstoke, Hants: Palgrave Macmillan, x + 301pp.
Casson, Mark C. (2000) Enterprise and Leadership: Studies on Firms, Markets and Networks, Cheltenham: Edward Elgar, x + 290 pp.
Casson, Mark C. (2000) Economics of International Business; A New Research Agenda, Cheltenham: Edward Elgar, xi + 316 pp.
Casson, Mark C. (1997) Information and Organization, Oxford: Oxford University Press.
Casson, Mark C. (1995) Entrepreneurship and Business Culture, Aldershot: Edward Elgar, x + 283pp.
Casson, Mark C. (1995) The Organization of International Business, Cheltenham: Edward Elgar, x + 209 pp.
Casson, Mark C. (1991) Economics of Business Culture: Game Theory, Transaction Costs and Economic *Casson, Mark C. (1991) 
Casson, Mark C. (1990) Enterprise and Competitiveness Oxford: Clarendon Press
Casson, Mark C. (1987) The Firm and the Market: Studies in Multinational Enterprises and the Scope of The Firm, Cambridge, Massachusetts: MIT Press and Oxford: Blackwell, xii + 283 pp.
Casson, Mark C. and associates (1986) Multinationals and World Trade: Vertical Integration and the Division of Labour in World Industries, London: Allen & Unwin, xv + 401 pp.
Peter J. Buckley and Mark C.Casson (1985) The Economic Theory of the Multinational Enterprise: Selected Papers, London: Macmillan, xii + 235pp.
Casson, Mark C. (1983) Economics of Unemployment: An Historical Perspective, Cambridge, Massachusetts; MIT Press and Oxford: Blackwell.
Casson, Mark C. (1982) The Entrepreneur: An Economic Theory, Oxford: Martin Robertson, [2nd. ed., Edward Elgar, 2003]
Casson, Mark C. (1981) Unemployment: A Disequilibrium Approach, Oxford: Martin Robertson, xv + 263pp.
Casson, Mark C. (1979) Youth Unemployment, London: Macmillan, xiii + 120pp.
Casson, Mark C. (1979) Alternatives to the Multinational Enterprise, London: Macmillan xiii + 120pp
Buckley, Peter J. and Mark C. Casson (1976) The Future of the Multinational Enterprise, London: Macmillan [25th Anniversary ed. 2001], 112pp.

This list excludes edited volumes and book series - for details of these see the external link below

References

External links
University profile

Academics of the University of Reading
Living people
1945 births
Fellows of the British Academy
British economists